is an anime and manga series about a kindergarten student who has many of the features of a child prodigy but at the same time displays many bizarre habits and an odd personality.

Characters 
Kiko Ninomiya

Kiko is a four-year-old (five in the end of the series) girl who attends a private kindergarten in Tokyo. She is capable of doing many things most four-year-olds are not capable of; these include cooking, unassisted grocery shopping, limited acrobatics. Despite the title of the series, it is very rare to actually see Kiko smile and almost as rare for her to speak. Despite this, Kiko is quite popular with her classmates. She also has a wide variety of interests, including ballet, learning English, playing video games and interfering with her teacher's love life.

Makiko and Tarou
Kiko's parents. Papa is a salaryman, Mama is a housewife, and both find their daughter a source of much puzzlement and frustration. Still they are devoted parents.

Megumi-sensei

Kiko's kindergarten teacher. She is twenty years old, and this is her first job out of teaching college. Kiko's eccentricities nearly make it her last, but Kiko is fond of her and turns her happiness into a personal project. Kiko also interferes with her love life, and helped her to find a boyfriend whom she married in the last episode. She hates carrots, to the point of fainting when she sees one. But carrots are her boyfriend's family's favorite food, so she often had to ask Kiko for help on the dates. She is extremely careless, even losing her wedding ring.

Tenshi

An angel who has come to Earth in the form of a black cat on a mission to spread happiness throughout the world. Unfortunately he is unable to communicate with humans (who hear his speech as cat noises), and even more unfortunately for him Kiko adopts him. Even more problematically, he falls hopelessly in love with a vain female cat named Rosa, who eventually reciprocates his affection long enough to bear a litter of five kittens, who she leaves to his (and, without her knowledge, Kiko's) care. His nickname is Neko-chan.

Tenshi's litters
They're named 'pa','pi','pu','pe',and 'po' by Kiko based on the only words that they can pronounce. They are also angels (even though Rosa, their mother, is just a regular cat), and they are able to use supernatural powers. Like normal kittens, they are mischievous and energetic, and they proved themselves to be smarter than Neko-chan, such as the time when Kiko wanted a hippo, Tenshi went to Africa by holding onto a plane, while the kittens just went to the local zoo. They like chocolate and are able to sing.

Akuma

A devil who is the Tenshi's rival and has come to Earth in the form of a Siamese cat on a mission to spread chaos throughout the world. He carries a ball on his collar that causes bad things to happen. Unlike his rival, he was never adopted.

References

 http://www.technogirls.org/technogirls/kikochan.htm

External links 
 

1996 anime television series debuts
1993 manga
Comedy anime and manga
Eiken (studio)
Josei manga
Kodansha manga
Magic Bus (studio)
School life in anime and manga
TBS Television (Japan) original programming
Animated television series about children